Svečane (in older sources Svečani) is a settlement in the Slovene Hills southeast of Sladki Vrh in the Municipality of Šentilj in northeastern Slovenia.

References

External links
Svečane on Geopedia

Populated places in the Municipality of Šentilj